The Dominica Amalgamated Workers' Union is a trade union in Dominica. It is affiliated with the International Trade Union Confederation.

References

Trade unions in Dominica
International Trade Union Confederation